Efrén Rebolledo, born Santiago Procopio Rebolledo, (Actopan, Hidalgo, Mexico 9 July 1877 – Madrid, Spain 10 December 1929) was a Mexican orientalist, modernist poet, diplomat, and lawyer. His poetry had parnassianist influences, such as in Cuarzos. It also touched erotic themes such as lesbianism in Victrix Caro and El beso de Safo; similar to José Juan Tablada, Rebolledo was ostracized by his contemporaries for this.

Biography
On 9 July 1877, Rebolledo was born in Actopan, Hidalgo, Mexico to Petronilo Flores, who abandoned the family, and Otomi Petra Rebolledo; he also had a brother named Francisco. He was baptized at San Nicolás Tolentino parish as Santiago Procopio but took the name of Ephrem the Syrian and did not take his father's surname. During his youth, his family faced poverty and also grew up in Pachuca. He also collaborated with Revista de Revistas, and Vida Moderna, among others.  compared Rebolledo's values to the Mexican Youth Athenaeum based off of his strong inclination to literature and his works published in Vida Moderna.

In 1901, he joined the diplomatic corps, possibly as suggested by Bernardo Reyes, under the protection of Ignacio Mariscal. He represented Mexico in Cuba, Chile, Guatemala, the French Third Republic, the Kingdom of the Netherlands, Great Qing, and the Empire of Japan. His near decade-long stay in Japan had a lasting effect on his work, writing a novel of his experience in Nikkō and translating a local saying to Spanish that reads: "Who has never seen Nikko, cannot say magnificent." He composed Rimas japonesas while in Tokyo, writing of its nights while thinking of prostitutes:

Before ambassador  departure for Europe, he designated Rebolledo as chargé d'affaires. He himself left in June 1915 funded by a loan from Mitsui & Co.

Between 1911 and 1919, in addition to his own works he translated those by Rudyard Kipling, Oscar Wilde, and Maurice Maeterlinck. In 1912, he founded Nosotros magazine with Gregorio López, and Rodrigo Torres Hernández; with Enrique González Martínez and Ramón López Velarde, he founded the Revista Pegaso in 1917. In his campaign he made home visits and held literary gatherings where he gave out his books. During his tenure, he fought for the rights of the Mezquital Valley peasants, however was comfortable under the regimes of Porfirio Díaz and Victoriano Huerta.

He served as first secretary in Oslo, Norway from August 1919 to 1922. His 1922 works were published by Peter Tidemand Malling's Det Mallingske Bogtrykkeri. In 1919, he met 19-year-old Thorborg Blomkvist, whom he married in spring 1921. They had three children: Thor Rebolledo Blomkvist (December 1921), Efrén Rebolledo Blomkvist (1924–2006), and Gloria Rebolledo Blomkvist. Between July and December 1921, he worked on Saga de Sigrida la Blonda; he gave a personal copy to his son Efrén, who gifted it to friend and co-worker at the University of Oslo Professor Juan López Pellicer. After his tenure he moved to Madrid, Spain.

On 10 or 11 December 1929, he died in Madrid due to complications with face paralysis first suffered in 1910. Javier Sánchez Mejorada requested his remains be returned to Mexico and his family receive a lifetime pension; neither were granted. Rebolledo was buried in the Cementerio de la Almudena on 15 July 1940 and no pension was awarded to Blomkvist-Rebolledo. One of his descendants is his Norwegian grandson, Torgeir Rebolledo Pedersen.

Works
El enemigo (novel, 1900)
Cuarzos (poems, 1902)
Más allá de las nubes (poems, 1903)
Hilos de corales, (poems, 1904)
Estela (poems and prose poems, 1907)
Joyeles (anthology, 1907)
Rimas japonesas (poems, 1907, edited in 1915)
Nikko (travelogue, 1910)
Hojas de bambú (novel, 1910)
El desencanto de Dulcinea (prose poems, 1916)
Caro victrix (poems, 1916) 
 Libro de loco amor (1916)
El águila que cae (tragedy, 1916)
Salamandra, novela de Efrén Rebolledo (1919, edited in Norway in 1922)
Joyelero (collection of poems, 1922)
Saga de Sigrida la Blonda (novel, 1922)

References

Bibliography

1877 births
1929 deaths
20th-century Mexican poets
Modernist poets
20th-century Mexican male writers
Mexican male poets
Writers from Hidalgo (state)
Politicians from Hidalgo (state)
National Autonomous University of Mexico alumni
20th-century Mexican lawyers
Mexican diplomats
People from Actopan, Hidalgo